Max Harris (born 29 April 1978) is an English professional golfer.

Harris attended the University of North Carolina on a golf scholarship before turning professional in 2000. In 2001 he played two tournaments on the Nationwide Tour, finishing tied for 12th in the Buy.com Richmond Open and missing the cut at The Buy.com Steamtown Classic. He has since returned to England, where he has worked as a club professional and competed on the third tier PGA EuroPro Tour.

Team appearances
Amateur
European Boys' Team Championship (representing England): 1994 (winners)
Palmer Cup (representing Great Britain & Ireland): 1998 (tie), 1999, 2000 (winners)
St Andrews Trophy (representing Great Britain & Ireland): 2000 (winners)

References

External links

Profile on the North Carolina University Tar Heels' official site

English male golfers
North Carolina Tar Heels men's golfers
Sportspeople from Worthing
1978 births
Living people